The 1951 Florida Gators football team represented the University of Florida during the 1951 college football season. The season was Bob Woodruff's second as the head coach of the Florida Gators football team. The highlights of the season included two intersectional victories over the Wyoming Cowboys (13–0) and the Loyola Lions (40–7), and two Southeastern Conference (SEC) victories over the Vanderbilt Commodores (33–13) during Florida's homecoming and the Alabama Crimson Tide (30–21) in Tuscaloosa, Alabama. For the second year in a row, Woodruff's 1951 Florida Gators finished 5–5 overall and 2–4 in the SEC, placing ninth among twelve conference teams.

Schedule

References

Florida
Florida Gators football seasons
Florida Gators football